Jeffrey M. Y Lay/Honorat (born October, 1962 is a retired rower from Canada. He won the silver medal at the 1996 Summer Olympics in the Men's Lightweight Coxless Fours, alongside Brian Peaker, Dave Boyes, and Gavin Hassett.

References
sports-reference Jeffrey Lay/Honorat

1962 births
Living people
Canadian male rowers
Olympic rowers of Canada
Rowers at the 1996 Summer Olympics
Olympic silver medalists for Canada
Rowers from Ottawa
Olympic medalists in rowing
Medalists at the 1996 Summer Olympics
Pan American Games medalists in rowing
Pan American Games silver medalists for Canada
Rowers at the 1995 Pan American Games
20th-century Canadian people